Jan Piskáček (born September 11, 1989) is a Czech professional ice hockey defenceman currently playing under contract with HC Škoda Plzeň of the Czech Extraliga (ELH).  He formerly played with HC Sparta Praha in the ELH during the 2010–11 Czech Extraliga season.

References

External links

1989 births
Living people
Cape Breton Screaming Eagles players
Czech ice hockey defencemen
Czech expatriate ice hockey players in Canada
Rytíři Kladno players
Motor České Budějovice players
HC Plzeň players
Sportspeople from Kladno